The Women's 100 metre butterfly S10 event at the 2020 Paralympic Games took place on 31 August 2021, at the Tokyo Aquatics Centre.

Final

References

Swimming at the 2020 Summer Paralympics
2021 in women's swimming